Scaphinotus andrewsii is one of 60 species of ground beetles in the family Carabidae. It is found in North America, living in moist areas and eat snails.

Subspecies
 S. andrewsii amplicollis (Casey, 1920)
 S. andrewsii andrewsii (T. Harris, 1839)
 S. andrewsii darlingtoni (Valentine, 1935)
 S. andrewsii germari (Chaudoir, 1861)
 S. andrewsii mutabilis (Casey, 1920)
 S. andrewsii parvitarsalis (Valentine, 1935)
 S. andrewsii waldensius (Valentine, 1935)

References

 Bousquet, Yves (2012). "Catalogue of Geadephaga (Coleoptera, Adephaga) of America, north of Mexico". ZooKeys, issue 245, 1–1722.

Further reading

 Arnett, R.H. Jr., and M. C. Thomas. (eds.). (2000). American Beetles, Volume I: Archostemata, Myxophaga, Adephaga, Polyphaga: Staphyliniformia. CRC Press LLC, Boca Raton, FL.
 Arnett, Ross H. (2000). American Insects: A Handbook of the Insects of America North of Mexico. CRC Press.
 Richard E. White. (1983). Peterson Field Guides: Beetles. Houghton Mifflin Company.

External links

 NCBI Taxonomy Browser, Scaphinotus andrewsii

Carabinae
Beetles described in 1839